I Am Easy to Find may refer to:

 I Am Easy to Find (album), a 2019 album by The National
 "I Am Easy to Find", the title track from the album
 I Am Easy to Find (film), a companion film to the album of the same name by Mike Mills starring Alicia Vikander